I-Trans cluster is a French cluster for railway industry, sustainable multimodal and urban transportation systems. It is located in Northern France at Villeneuve-d'Ascq and Valenciennes and is supported by Université Lille Nord de France, Réseau Ferré de France, SNCF, Alstom.

Overview

Ralenium institute 
I-Trans cluster is the founding member of Ralenium institute.

External links 
I-Trans web site

High-technology business districts in France
University of Lille Nord de France